Maykhe, also given as Mayke, is an abandoned military air base of the Soviet Air Force in Primorsky Krai, Russia. It is located about 20 km (12 miles) east of the town of Artyom.  It was identified by Western intelligence as early as 1962, and in 1971 it was linked to a missile facility northeast of the airfield.

The airfield fell into disuse after the Cold War, and photo galleries on Wikimapia show auto racing events on the former runway.

References

Soviet Air Force bases